Il sorpasso can refer to:
Il Sorpasso (The Easy Life), a 1962 Italian movie
Il sorpasso (economics), a 1987 announcement by the Italian government that its economy had surpassed that of the United Kingdom

Italian words and phrases